The Road Home is an American family drama television series created by Bruce Paltrow and John Tinker, series that aired on CBS from March 5, 1994, to April 16, 1994. The series starred Karen Allen, Ed Flanders, Terence Knox, Jessica Bowman and Christopher Masterson. Just 6 episodes were produced. The series reunited Paltrow, Tinker, Flanders, and Knox, as they previously worked together on St. Elsewhere.

Premise
The series focuses on Alison Matson and her family who returned home to North Carolina from Detroit to run her family's shrimp boat business.

Cast
 Karen Allen as Alison Matson
 Terence Knox as Jack Matson
 Christopher Masterson as Sawyer Matson
 Jessica Bowman as Darcy Matson
 Gregory Perrelli as Calvin Matson
 Cecilley Carroll as Jinx Matson
 Ed Flanders as Walter Babineaux
 Frances Sternhagen as Charlotte Babineaux
 Bobby Fain as Arthur Dumas
 Alex McArthur as Dickie Babineaux

References

External links 

1994 American television series debuts
CBS original programming
English-language television shows
1994 American television series endings
1990s American drama television series
Television series by CBS Studios
Television shows set in North Carolina